Fernando Botero Zea (Mexico City, Mexico, August 23, 1956) is a businessman and liberal politician of dual Colombia and Mexican nationalities, mainly known for having served as Minister of National Defense of Colombia among other political posts. He is the son of Colombian figurative artist  Fernando Botero and cultural promoter Gloria Zea.

Biography

Childhood

Born in Mexico City, Fernando Botero Zea is the first son of artist Fernando Botero and the cultural promoter and director for 46 years of the Museum of Modern Art of Bogotá Gloria Zea, who also served as Minister of Culture of Colombia from 1974 to 1982.

Fernando Botero Zea's parents divorced in 1960, just five years after their marriage. Botero Zea has a sister named Lina, who is an art curator and interior designer, and a brother named Juan Carlos, who is a writer.

Botero Zea's childhood was influenced by his stepfather, Andrés Uribe Campuzano, who was married to his mother Gloría Zea. Andrés Uribe Campuzano was a Colombian businessman, creator of the Juan Valdez Café brand and shareholder of some companies in Colombia.

Education

When Botero was just four years old, his family moved to New York, taking advantage of the fact that his maternal grandfather, German Zea Hernandez, had been appointed Colombia's Ambassador to the United Nations.

In New York, from 1960 to 1967, Botero studied at the Trent School and then at Trinity School. From 1967 to 1969, Botero boarded at the Fessenden School in Boston, Massachusetts. At that school, he was elected president of his class, awakening his early interest in politics.

In 1973, Botero's mother Gloria Zea and her then husband Andrés Uribe Campuzano were kidnapped. The couple was released after paying ransom and being held in captivity for several weeks. But due to the risk of the kidnapping of other members of the family, they decided to leave the country.

Faced with this new and unexpected family and security situation, Botero Zea entered the Ecole Nouvelle de la Suisse Romande in 1973 where he graduated in 1974 with an International Baccalaureate.

At the university stage Fernando Botero Zea began his process of academic formation. He first studied in Paris, France. There he obtained, in 1975, a Certificat d'Études Politiques (Certificate of Political Studies) at the Institut d'Études Politiques de Paris. Returning to Colombia in 1975, he graduated from the Universidad de los Andes (Colombia) with a degree in Economics and Political Science in 1980.

In 1980, he began a joint program between the Business School and the School of Government at Harvard University. There he earned two master's degrees: Master of Business Administration from Harvard Business School and Master of Public Finance from the John F. Kennedy School of Government in 1983.

Years later - and after his time in Colombia's politics - he returned to his passion for study. Thus, it was that in 1999 he completed a Master's Degree in Journalism from City University London. Botero's thesis was entitled "The Colombian Community in the UK: Myths and Realities". In his thesis, Botero Zea documents the particularity that nearly 80% of Colombian migrants living in the UK come from the municipality of Sevilla, Valle del Cauca and the surrounding municipalities in that corner of southwestern Colombia, working in their country of destination in legal jobs.

In 2016, he completed a Master's Degree in the Science of Happiness at the Universidad Tec Milenio, part of the Monterrey Institute of Technology and Higher Education.

Death of Pedrito Botero

When Botero Zea was 17 years old, he was involved in an automobile accident on the road from Seville to Madrid in southern Spain. In this accident, his younger brother Pedro Botero Zambrano was tragically killed. The Botero family was on Easter vacation in 1973, when the accident happened. In the car were Master Fernando Botero, his then wife Cecilia Zambrano, his sister Lina and his brother Pedro, as well as Botero Zea himself. In this automobile accident not only Pedro Botero lost his life, but also Master Botero himself was seriously injured in both hands.

Early activity in the private sector

McKinsey and Company in New York City and Spain

In the summer of 1982, during his two master's degrees at Harvard University, and after graduating in 1983, Botero Zea became a consultant at McKinsey and Company. Initially assigned to the New York office, and later transferred to the Madrid office, Botero concentrated his work on one of the firm's major clients in Spain, Banco Herrero, which was based in Oviedo, Spain. The economic reforms and the new liberal policies that developed at the time, created an environment of uncertainty and great challenges for that bank.

Thanks to the work of the McKinsey team and the role of Botero Zea, Banco Herrero was able to restructure internally and position itself in the Spanish banking environment of the early 1980s, when the bank was absorbed by a larger bank, BBVA of Spain.

Stock exchange in Bogotá, Colombia

In 1984, he returned to Colombia to become president of Compañía de Servicios Bursátiles S.A., one of the brokerage firms that made part of the Bogotá stock exchange. During his tenure, from 1984 to 1988, the company moved from 17th place among the different companies on the Bogotá Stock Exchange to third place.

Time management and personal productivity consultant

Simultaneous to his work at the Bogota Stock Exchange, Botero Zea developed a side business as a consultant on time management and productivity for large companies and multinationals in Colombia. In 1986, he published a cassette with the title "Efficient Time Management", which was produced in a large quantity of copies, destined to national and multinational companies, and also to be distributed through libraries in Colombia.

Political career

Local Mayors Coordinator

In 1979, Botero Zea occupied the first position in his life as Coordinator of Local  Mayors of Bogota, part to the Department of Government   of the Bogotá City Hall. The Secretary of Government at the time  was Luis Guillermo Sorzano and the Mayor of Bogota, Hernando Durán Dussán. Botero's responsibility was to coordinate the 20 Local Mayors that existed in the capital.

Botero was head of that office for a year, until he made the  decision to enter electoral politics, seeking a seat in the Assembly of Cundinamarca Department in the 1980 elections. In that attempt, he was defeated and suffered his first electoral setback.

In 1986, Botero Zea ran for the position of Councilman of Bogotá. Botero Zea was elected but did not serve on the Bogotá City Council because a few days after his election he was appointed Deputy Minister of Government by President Virgilio Barco Vargas.

Deputy Minister of Government

Botero was appointed Deputy Minister of Government by President Virgilio Barco on August 7, 1986. The Minister of Government at the time was Fernando Cepeda Ulloa. At the head of his post, Botero Zea developed four main functions:

First, to serve as a connection between civilian and military power. In this capacity, Botero Zea was part of the Colombian National Security Council and served as a permanent connection between the Presidency of the Republic and the Ministry of Government, on the one hand, and the Colombian Armed Forces and the National Police, on the other.

A second function was to serve as the coordinator of the government's legislative program with a broad presence in the National Congress. Many of the Barco administration's bills passed through the office of the Deputy Minister of Government, defining the lobbying strategy and the management of Congress.

Third, to coordinate the Barco administration's work on administrative decentralization. Botero was in charge of drafting the presidential decrees, bills and ministerial resolutions in the years 1986 to 1988 that led to successive reforms of the Colombian state, aimed at achieving greater administrative decentralization.

A fourth function of Botero in the Ministry of Government was the development of the government-opposition political framework, devised by Minister Cepeda Ulloa, and partly carried out by Botero Zea and his team. In this context, he was in charge of multiple functions related to this framework at the level of the Congress, the Governors and the Mayors of the main cities of the country.

When Cepeda Ulloa resigned as Minister of Government in 1987, Botero Zea continued as Deputy Minister of the new Minister César Gaviria Trujillo, who was elected President of the Republic in 1990.

In 1988, Botero resigned from his position as Deputy Minister of Government to run for election as Councilman of Bogotá, which he achieved in 1988 with a large vote.

Second election to the Council of Bogotá

In the Bogota Council, Botero Zea distinguished himself as President of the corporation. He was the author and promoter of the draft agreement that established environmental “green” councils in the different zones of the capital city. These councils were designed to create an active participation of the community in the defense of the environment and ecological protection of the flora and fauna of Bogotá.

Botero's main contribution to the development of Bogotá was his book Bogotá Descentralizada and his work on new government structures for the city. Then, the capital's government structures were reformed in the late 1980s and early 1990s, burying the old centralized organization of the local mayor's offices and developing a new structure of zonal mayor's offices and zonal councils, which have served to energize the city's development, bring the government closer to the communities and make the work of the government more efficient.

Book Bogotá Descentralizada

In his book Bogotá Descentralizada, Botero analyzes the centralized government structures that prevailed in Colombia's capital for much of the twentieth century, emphasizing the problems and limitations of centralized governments. Botero proposed a radical decentralization of city government inspired by two successful models: the system of the  arrondissements in Paris and the system of the delegations in Mexico City.

The book had an impact on Bogotá's political environment and was the basis for the decentralization reforms that created Bogotá's zonal mayors and the zonal councilor and alderman organization in the 1980s and 1990s, particularly during the mayoralty of Jaime Castro.

Candidate for Mayor of Bogotá

In 1989, Fernando Botero ran as a candidate for Mayor of Bogotá for the Liberal Party. He participated in a competition campaign with Juan Martín Caicedo Ferrer, who was the eventual winner of the race and later Mayor of the Colombian capital. At the November 1989 Liberal convention that chose the candidate, Botero won 42.3% of the delegates' votes running against Caicedo Ferrer.

General Secretary of the Colombian Liberal Party

In 1991 Botero Zea was appointed Secretary General of the Liberal Party, under the leadership of former President Alfonso López Michelsen.

During his administration, an important reform of the Liberal Party statutes took place, to make the party more democratic, more modern, more decentralized and more in tune with the party's social sectors.

Botero's administration coincided with the development of the National Constituent Assembly of 1991 and the promulgation of the new Political Constitution of Colombia in the same year. During the deliberations of the Constituent Assembly, Botero Zea presented on several occasions the official position of the Colombian Liberal Party on key issues such as the presidential run-off, political and administrative decentralization, the royalties regime, the national constituency of the Senate and other issues of fundamental importance.

Senate of the Republic

He was elected Senator of the Republic on two occasions. First, in the 1990 elections; and then again in 1991 after Congress was revoked by the National Constituent Assembly.

In the Senate of the Republic, Botero occupied a place in the Seventh Commission of the Senate. He was President of the Committee on several occasions.

In addition, he was rapporteur of the 1990 Labor Reform along with Senator Álvaro Uribe Vélez and the 1990 Pension Reform again with Uribe Vélez and other members of the committee.

These two reforms, the labor reform and the pension reform, were the bases of the social transformations of the government of César Gaviria. In particular, the pension reform gave rise to the birth of the private pension system that exists in Colombia today.

Botero Zea also played a role in the life of the Senate as the speaker and promoter of the debate against  the government of President Gaviria, when notorious drug lord Pablo Escobar escaped in 1992. Those debates showed the life of luxury that Pablo Escobar had in his prison, called La Catedral and the deception that had occurred to the Colombian and international public opinion with his submission to justice. An important consequence of the debate was the resignation of the Minister of Justice at the time, Fernando Carrillo Flórez.

Commission for State Reform

Botero Zea was appointed member of the State Reform Commission by President César Gaviria Trujillo in 1990. This commission was also composed of twelve experts, including Manuel José Cepeda, Marino Tadeo Lozano, Eduardo Mendoza de la Torre, Alfonso Esguerra Fajardo and several others.

The main task of this commission was to study the different structures of the Colombian State in order to propose the necessary reforms to modernize the State and make it more agile and dynamic.

The commission met between 1990 and 1991 and proposed a total of 32 bills, draft legislative acts and draft constitutional reforms that were adopted, for the most part, by the government of President Gaviria and by the National Constituent Assembly.

Minister of National Defense

Fernando Botero Zea was appointed Minister of Defense on August 7, 1994. His time at the Ministry is remembered for some important reforms of the institution.

The first was the creation of the Army Aviation in the format of the most modern armies of the world, including the United States, France, the United Kingdom and Israel. It is an air brigade, consisting mainly of troop transport helicopters, designed for rapid deployment of offensive and defensive armed forces. With this reform of Colombia's military structures, the Army's traditional dependence on the Air Force ended.

In the new organization, the Army acquired a tool of importance for the rapid movement of troops and the use of airspace as a method of attacking enemy forces, mainly guerrillas and drug cartels. The Air Force was left with its traditional role of defending Colombia´s national sovereignty.

Second, it developed an active program of respect and promotion of human rights within the Army and the National Police. One of the major advances in this area was the appointment of a human rights adviser to the Minister of Defense, a position first filled by Pilar Gaitán, a well-known human rights activist in Colombia. As a consequence of this reform, it was established that in each military battalion there would be a high-ranking officer with responsibility for the defense and protection of human rights, as well as the training of the officer corps and troops for these purposes. In addition, during Botero Zea's tenure, the military criminal justice system was reformed to take into account the guidelines and standards for the defense of human rights in Colombia.

Third, Botero Zea modernized and streamlined the contracting and supply process within the military forces to improve the logistical support of the troops.

Finally, he reformed Military and Police intelligence to integrate these intelligence sources and make it more operational and efficient for the different branches of the armed forces.

On the military and strategic front, Botero Zea used both the National Police and the Army in his pursuit of the Cali Cartel. During Botero Zea's tenure, the Cali Cartel's top leaders were all killed or imprisoned, including brothers Gilberto and Miguel Rodríguez Orejuela, Phanor Arizabaleta, Helmer "Pacho" Herrera, and José Santa Cruz Londoño.
 
On the other hand, Botero Zea developed an aggressive campaign against the guerrillas, especially the fronts of the Revolutionary Armed Forces of Colombia (FARC) that operated in Magdalena Medio and the departments of Bolívar, Cesar, Córdoba, eastern Antioquia, Urabá, Valle del Cauca, Cauca, Nariño, Putumayo, Huila and Caquetá.

The 1994 Political Campaign

Shortly after Ernesto Samper's 1994 presidential victory, Samper's opponent and future successor, Andres Pastrana, accused Samper of having received campaign donations from the Cali Cartel in the amount of 6 million USD.

Colombian Attorney General Alfonso Valdivieso Sarmiento personally led the investigation. Valdivieso is a cousin of the late Luis Carlos Galán, a charismatic presidential candidate assassinated in 1989 by the Medellín Cartel for his political views. Galán favored the extradition of drug traffickers to the United States for prosecution.

Valdivieso's investigation revealed connections between the Cali cartel and major figures in Colombian society, including politicians, journalists, athletes, and military and police officers, among others.

As a result, numerous politicians and senior members of the government were indicted. Botero was arrested in connection with this investigation and accused of having facilitated the entry of illegal money into the presidential campaign. He was sentenced to 30 months' detention at the Escuela de Caballería, a military base located in northern Bogotá. Upon completion of his sentence, Botero Zea was released on February 12, 1998.

Second Trial

In 1999, another case was opened against Botero for the alleged embezzlement of more than 800 million Colombian pesos destined for the same 1994 presidential campaign. The accusation was brought by the then Attorney General Alfonso Gómez Méndez, appointed by President Samper, who was a political enemy of Botero by that time.

In 2002, Judge 37 of the Colombian capital assessed the prosecution's accusation, conducted an exhaustive investigation of Botero Zea's bank accounts and financial movements, and finally declared him innocent of the crimes of which he was accused. A few weeks later, in 2003, the Bogotá Superior Court, subject to political pressure from Samper and his allies, overturned the sentence of Bogotá's 37th Criminal Court.

In January 2007, the Supreme Court of Justice reaffirmed the ruling by the Superior Court of Bogota.

In a televised interview for Canal RCN on Tuesday, February 13, 2007, Botero presented proof of his innocence, including the deed to a property that Botero's family had sold at the time of the events, and denounced  the political persecution that was allegedly the cause of the adverse rulings of justice and offered previously unknown details.

In 2009, due to the accumulation of sentences decreed by the Superior Court of Bogotá in the last instance, Botero Zea obtained the benefit of freedom and the end of his criminal proceedings. Since then, he has dedicated his personal and professional time between Mexico and Colombia.

Entrepreneurship at maturity

Grupo Editorial Estilo Mexico

Botero Zea founded Grupo Editorial Estilo México in 2002. This publishing group published during its existence an important number of magazines, among them Estilo México, Be, Espacio Corporativo, Destinos, Sabores, Estilo (Los Cabos, Acapulco, Riviera Maya, San Miguel de Allende, Aeromar magazine, Danhos magazine and Peyrelongue magazine, among other titles. Grupo Editorial Estilo México also edited and published the book México desde el Aire.

Book Conversaciones en la Cantina

In the book Conversaciones en la Cantina, Botero Zea attempts to sketch  the history of the 21st century in Mexico based on the testimony of the main protagonists of Mexican political life such as Jorge Castañeda, Felipe Calderón, Vicente Fox, Carlos Salinas de Gortari, Cuauhtémoc Cárdenas, among many others; as well as the vision of leading observers and analysts of Mexican political life and history such as Héctor Aguilar Camín, Carmen Aristegui, Germán Dehesa, Denise Dresser, Carlos Loret de Mola, Andrés Oppenheimer, among others.
 
The book became a success, which prompted a second and then a third edition, and the inclusion of the book in the curriculum of some universities in Mexico City.

Book México desde el cielo

The book México desde el cielo was made by Botero Zea in collaboration with Alejandro González, Ágata Lanz and Kike Arnal. The book is centered on the best air photographs of Mexico's landscapes and its most outstanding cultural sites. The book was acquired in its first edition, by the governments of the states of Quintana Roo, Jalisco, State of Mexico, Baja California Sur, among others.

Itacate

In 2008 Botero Zea founded Itacate de Mexico, a company dedicated to the delivery of low-cost nutritious food as a provider of government plans at the municipal, state and federal level. Itacates food programs were developed in important Mexican states such as Nuevo Leon, Hidalgo, Jalisco, Campeche, Quinta Roo, Chiapas, Guerrero, Michoacan, Baja California Sur, Baja California Norte, State of Mexico and Tamaulipas, among others.

Apart from the state governments, Itacate was present in large federal social programs, under the umbrella of the Secretary of Social Development and the Department of Family Integration (DIF).

In Colombia, Itacate fed large groups of low-income children in Medellín and Cali, respectively, through programs associated with the Mayor's Office of Cali, on the one hand, and the Governor's Office of the Department of Antioquia and the Mayor's Office of Medellín, on the other.

BodyBrite

In 2011, Fernando Botero Zea brought to Colombia a representation of BodyBrite, a beauty store brand that already existed in Mexico.

BodyBrite Colombia began operations in 2012 and achieved eighty franchises and/or own stores in 26 different cities in Colombia, serving an average of 200,000 customers per year.

In 2015, Botero Zea decided to buy 28% of BodyBrite Mexico with a view to integrating BodyBrite'''s operations in Mexico and Colombia as well as in Spain, China and other countries. This is how BodyBrite begins to emerge as a medium-sized multinational company, being a market leader in its field not only in Mexico and Colombia, but also in Shanghai, China.BodyBrites development in China has been rapid. The operation has so far been concentrated in Shanghai province, one of the largest and most prosperous provinces in China. There are now around 80 BodyBrite locations in the province, making BodyBrite the market leader in that part of China. The company's plans for the period 2022 to 2024 are to expand activities to the cities of Beijing and Guangzhou. In the medium term, the company aims to have 2000 Bodybrite stores in China in the next 5 years.

Botero in China

In 2014, Botero Zea picked up the cultural and artistic legacy of his family  and decided to create Botero-in-China, the company in charge of organizing the first exhibition of Master Fernando Botero in China. The exhibition included his father's major work and was presented in Beijing, Shanghai and Hong Kong. The Botero- in-China exhibitions attracted more than 1.5 million visitors. By 2021, the same company had organized more than 200 educational conferences in 21 different countries worldwide.

Through the company Botero-in-China, Fernando Botero Zea has opened new frontiers for the work of his father Fernando Botero, in China as well as in other  Asian countries such as Japan, Singapore, Malaysia, Thailand and the Philippines.

In the midst of the Covid-19 pandemic, Botero Zea also began opening spaces for his father's work in the Middle East, in countries such as the United Arab Emirates, Saudi Arabia, Qatar, Jordan, Israel and Kuwait. He also plans to extend his father's work in the medium term to India, a promising art market in the future.

Activity in education

University professor and teaching experience

Botero Zea has also dedicated many years of his life to teaching. He has been a university professor in both Colombia and Mexico in the fields of Macroeconomic Policy and Finance.

His first teaching experience was in the Faculty of Business Administration at the Universidad de los Andes. In that faculty, he taught Introduction to Finance from 1984 to 1994. Since 1985, Botero Zea extended his teaching activities to the Faculty of Economics at the Universidad de los Andes. In that faculty, he taught Macroeconomic Policy from 1985 to 1994.

Between 1989 and 1994, he taught Finance and International Relations at the School of Economics of the Universidad Externado de Colombia.

When Botero Zea moved to Mexico in 1999, he looked for a way to continue his teaching. Between 1999 and 2003, he taught Macroeconomic Policy at the School of Economics at the Universidad Iberoamericana and the same at the Universidad de la Américas, both in Mexico City.

Landmark Education

In 2001, shortly after taking up residence in Mexico, Botero Zea created Landmark Education of Mexico, focused on human potential courses. This company has also seen its expansion in Colombia since 2005.

Botero was the founder and principal architect of Landmark Education's expansion in Latin America, where it has three main epicenters: Mexico City, Bogotá in Colombia and Sao Paolo in Brazil.

In the framework of Landmark Education, Botero Zea has taught seminars and various courses from 2002 to 2014 on topics such as money management, human potential, relationships and business development.

Philanthropy Activities

Following the legacy of Gloria Zea -who was an important promoter of the development of opera in her country- Fernando Botero Zea has been, since his mother's death in 2019, a promotor of the opera in Colombia.

On the other hand, Botero Zea has collaborated in the development of Rosaura Henkel's philanthropic work at the head of the National Institute of Neurology in Mexico. He is also a donor to Greenpeace in defense of the environment and a benefactor of the Institute of Contemporary Art in San Diego, California.

He is currently building the "Gloria Zea Hall", in the Vereda de Rio Frio Occidental of the municipality of Tabio, Cundinamarca, to have a space for culture, concerts and musical events in that area of Colombia.

Family life

Botero Zea married María Elvira Quintana in 1988. They had two sons: Fernando Botero Quintana and Felipe Botero Quintana. Botero also has a daughter, Camila Botero Llano, born from a previous relationship. In 1999, Botero married María Inés Londoño Reyes, daughter of Fernando Londoño Henao, who had 3 daughters from her previous marriage.

He has seven grandchildren: Cayetana, Pedro and Felipe Roca de Togores; Federica Peyrelongue; Antonia and Paulina Klapp, and Martina Botero.

Fernando Botero Zea lives with his wife, Maria Inés Londoño Reyes, in Mexico City and travels frequently to Colombia and other countries. He is dedicated to his businesses, mainly Botero-in-China and BodyBrite; to expanding the legacy of his father, Fernando Botero and to his activities in the fields of education, sports and hobbies.

 See also 

 Ministry of National Defense (Colombia)
 Colombian Liberal Party
 Ernesto Samper
 Botero Museum. Located in Bogotá, Colombia
 Botero. Italian surname

References

External links
 Artistic exhibition of Master Fernando Botero Angulo, organized by Fernando Botero Zea
 Fernando Botero Zea Instagram''
 The artist Fernando Botero talks about creativity with Ultravioleta through his son (Fernando Botero Zea). (In Spanish)

1956 births
Living people
People from Mexico City
Mexican people of Colombian descent
University of Los Andes (Colombia) alumni
Colombian political scientists
Colombian Liberal Party politicians
Members of the Chamber of Representatives of Colombia
Colombian Ministers of Defense
Fugitives wanted by Colombia
Harvard Kennedy School alumni
Harvard Business School alumni
Colombian expatriates in the United States
Colombian politicians convicted of crimes